The Thaddeus Chapin House is a historic house located at 128 Thad Chapin Street in Canandaigua, Ontario County, New York.

Description and history 
It is a two-story, six-bay-wide, brick dwelling on a slightly raised basement in the Federal style. The sides of the house have a steeped gabled roof and there is front porch in the center of the house around the main entrance. It was built in the 1820s. Also on the property is a late 19th-century frame barn.

It was listed on the National Register of Historic Places on April 26, 1984.

References

External links

Houses on the National Register of Historic Places in New York (state)
Federal architecture in New York (state)
Houses completed in 1820
Houses in Ontario County, New York
National Register of Historic Places in Ontario County, New York